1147 Stavropolis is a stony background asteroid from the inner regions of the asteroid belt. It was discovered on 11 June 1929, by Georgian–Russian astronomer Grigory Neujmin at the Simeiz Observatory on the Crimean peninsula. It was named after the Russian city of Stavropol.

Orbit and classification 

Stavropolis is a non-family asteroid of the main belt's background population when applying the hierarchical clustering method to its proper orbital elements. It orbits the Sun in the inner asteroid belt at a distance of 1.7–2.8 AU once every 3 years and 5 months (1,250 days). Its orbit has an eccentricity of 0.23 and an inclination of 4° with respect to the ecliptic. The body's observation arc begins at with its official discovery observation at Simeiz.

Naming 

This minor planet was named by the discover after the Russian city of Stavropol, located in northern Caucasus region. From 1936 to 1946, the city was named "Woroschilowsk". The  was mentioned in The Names of the Minor Planets by Paul Herget in 1955.

Physical characteristics 

In the Bus–Binzel SMASS classification, Stavropolis is a common stony S-type asteroid, while in the Bus–DeMeo classification, it is an Sw-subtype.

Rotation period and poles 

In September 2001, a rotational lightcurve of Stavropolis was obtained from photometric observations by Americans Larry Robinson and Brian Warner at the Sunflower  and Palmer Divide Observatory  in Kansas and Colorado, respectively. Lightcurve analysis gave a rotation period of  hours with a brightness variation of 0.42 magnitude.

In October 2015, another lightcurve was obtained by French amateur astronomer Pierre Antonini. It gave a well-defined period of  hours with an amplitude of 0.32 magnitude. A 2016-published lightcurve, using modeled photometric data from the Lowell Photometric Database (LPD), gave a concurring period of  hours, as well as two spin axes of (78.0°, −50.0°) and (267.0°, −51.0°) in ecliptic coordinates (λ, β).

Diameter and albedo 

According to the survey carried out by the NEOWISE mission of NASA's Wide-field Infrared Survey Explorer, Stavropolis measures between 10.94 and 13.898 kilometers in diameter and its surface has an albedo between 0.146 and 0.406, while the Japanese Akari satellite found a diameter of 13.92 kilometers with an albedo of 0.145. The Collaborative Asteroid Lightcurve Link assumes a standard albedo for stony asteroids of 0.20 and calculates a diameter of 14.89 kilometers based on an absolute magnitude of 11.5.

References

External links 
 Lightcurve Database Query (LCDB), at www.minorplanet.info
 Dictionary of Minor Planet Names, Google books
 Asteroids and comets rotation curves, CdR – Geneva Observatory, Raoul Behrend
 Discovery Circumstances: Numbered Minor Planets (1)-(5000) – Minor Planet Center
 
 

001147
Discoveries by Grigory Neujmin
Named minor planets
001147
19290611